Hypertext Magazine is a non-profit social justice literary magazine based in Chicago, Illinois. Founded in 2010 by the editor-in-chief, Christine Maul Rice, the magazine print edition is published bi-annually, and the online content is published on a rolling basis. Writing is categorised under essays, short stories, interviews and cultural commentary. Subscription to the magazine is free for readers.

Alongside the goal to create writing that pushes the boundaries in form and content, Hypertext Magazine "missions include: teaching writing, publishing writing, paying writers and visual artists." Founding the ‘Hypertext Studio’, Christine Maul Rice holds ‘Story Workshops’ to celebrate and foster diverse voices in story-telling, as well as dedicate teaching resources to those communities impacted by a form of violence. The philanthropic efforts of the Magazine have garnered them a ‘2018 Gold Star Seal of Transparency’ by GuideStar to validate their charity.

History 

The magazine was founded online in 2010 after editor-in-chief, Christine Maul Rice, attended the 2008 Story Week editorial panel at Columbia College and discovered a large proportion of the 18-21 demographic read fiction online, rather than in print. Prior to this, Rice had been a freelance writer, teacher, novelist and had edited the student literary magazine, Hair Trigger, for eight years.

Hypertext Magazine expanded from solely an online literary magazine to bi-annual print magazine in 2017. After seven years of online distribution of content, the first print journal was published in 2017, with an intention of publishing two editions per year.

In addition to a bi-annual print magazine, Rice also launched Hypertext Magazine & Studio in 2017. Aiming to provide teaching workshops for diverse and underprivileged members of the community, as well as assist those suffering from violence, the Hypertext Studio accepts donations from their readership. Certified ‘Gold’ by GuideStar with a ‘Seal of Transparency’, the charity has been assessed as legitimate.

Recognised as a "great source for culturally diverse and alternative story formats", this Chicago-based literary magazine publishes both established and budding writers from across the globe. Notable writers include Christine Sneed, Jillian Lauren, Joe Meno and Sheree L. Greer, Brian Alan Ellis and Bud Smith. This Magazine currently has an open-submission policy, with the submissions for fiction, essays, and interviews being open from September 1 to May 31.

Rice estimates that since its beginning, the magazine has published up to 600 fiction short stories, essays, interviews, graphic comics, novel excerpts and pieces of poetry.

Content areas 

Hypertext Magazine divides content into four areas; essays, fiction, interviews and culture.

Essays, novel excerpts and short stories can be up to 3000 words and under, with the print edition up to 5000 words. Hypertext Magazine is interested in flash-fiction writing up to 1000 words  for both fiction and non-fiction.

Additionally, the Magazine is interested in publishing "serial fiction and graphic novels, editorial cartoons, and interviews."

There is currently no financial payment offered to writers.

Print edition 
In addition to producing online content on a rolling basis, Hypertext Magazine is dedicated to an annual print journal that features both established and emerging writers.

The first print journal was published on January 18, 2017, and contained writing from Tyler Barton, Richard Hartshorn, Peter Eldritch, Bahiyyih El-Shabbaz, Rick George, Ron Burch, Karen Halvorsen Schreck, Bud Smith, Alex J. Parton, Donna Miscolta, Amy Dupcak, Wayne McMahon, Sahar Mustafah, Ilana Masad, Daniel Lynch, C.K. Flynn, Michael Howard, Cyn Vargas, Ken Rodgers, Brandon Flammang, Peter Kahn, Vann Harris, Michael Seymour Blake, Virginia Bell, Laura Page, Marcia Aldrich, John McNally, Patricia Ann McNair, Brian Alan Ellis, Jan Worth-Nelson, and Elle Nash. The paperback was 208 pages and sold for $15 at Amazon.

The second print journal was published on April 1, 2018, and contained writing by Christine Sneed, Peter Ferry, Yen Ha, Doro Boehme, Gint Aras, Gail Wallace Bozzano, Garnett Kilberg Cohen, Toni Nealie, Scott Atkinson, Kathleen Quigley, Shoshana Akabas, Anya Silver, Natasha Mijares, Nic Custer, Desiree Cooper, Re'Lynn Hansen, Garin Cycholl, Eileen Favorite, and Lasher Lane. The journal was 142 pages and sold for $15 on Amazon.

Hypertext Studio 

Founded in October 2017 by Hypertext Magazine’s editor-in-chief, Christine Maul Rice, Hypertext Studio’s aims to assist others in "creating art (that) helps us understand our personal journeys and the world." Based in Chicago, the studio receives donations to hold writing and storytelling workshops for marginalised voices in the community. Rice decided to establish the studio after witnessing the declined enrolment for the Columbia College Chicago and funding for teachers pushing initiatives developed and ran for years.

The Hypertext Studio website maintains that the main target for the workshops are "communities directly impacted by violence, people who are rebuilding their lives after being incarcerated, recovering from substance use disorders, or any underserved community." Rice confirmed the first workshop focused on teaching 15-20 individuals that were previously incarcerated.

The studio has been lauded as "an invaluable resource for the Chicago literary community." The workshops follow the teaching approach started by Professor of the Columbia College Chicago, John Schultz, which "celebrates the writer’s experience as a human being" The approach focuses on diversity in persons represented and content, with an emphasis on the use of the dialect of a community and imagery.

According to GuideStar’s summary, the demographics of the board members are 67% female, 58% white, 17% multiracial, 17% black or African American and 8% Hispanic or Latino. The budget was estimated to be $102,000 pa. The cost of the classes vary, but Christine Rice said the classes range between $500-$600 over a 10-week period. ‘Science-Fiction Writing’, ‘Creative Non-Fiction,’ and ‘Fiction Forms & Methods’ are examples of the type of classes on offer.

The studio often publishes the writing and art created in the workshops in Hypertext Magazine. By late 2019, the Studio seeks for the workshops to reach an approximately 100 Chicago locals. Christine Rice says the goal of the studio is to grow to become more established in the Chicago literary scene, inspiring "writers to walk out of a workshop completely in love with the process of writing."

Staff and contributors

Editor: Christine Maul Rice 
Rice is the founder and editor-in-chief of Hypertext Magazine, as well as the philanthropic platform, Hypertext Studio. After publishing the novel, Swarm Theory, Rice was a 2016 Chicago Writers Association Book of the Year finalist, in addition to being awarded an Independent Publisher Book Award and a National Indie Excellence Award. Her short stories have been published in notable literary magazines including The Literary Review, F Magazine and Roanoke Review, in addition to her long-form journalism, essays and interviews appearing on Storynews.net.

Managing Editor & Fiction Editor: Chelsea Laine Wells 
After graduating from the Columbia College of Chicago, Wells work has been published in numerous literary magazines and journals including The Butter, Paper Darts and Little Fiction. Accolades include first place in the Guild Complex Literary Awards, first place in the Columbia Scholastic Press Association Awards and nominations for two Pushcarts. Furthermore, Wells is a founding editor of Hypernova Lit, a digital literary journal publishing the writing of high school students, and works as a high school creative writing and English teacher in Dallas, Texas.

Copyeditor: Linda Naslund 
After 20 years of copy-editing for Columbia College of Chicago’s literary magazine, Hair Trigger, Linda Naslund both copyedits for Hypertext Magazine and assists writers preparing their manuscripts for publication.

Senior Editors 
Karen Halvorsen Schreck, Brian Schlender and Noelle Aleksandra Hufnagel comprise the team of ‘Senior Editors’ for Hypertext Magazine.

Karen Schreck is the author of the historical novel, Broken Ground, two novels for young adults and a book for children. Receiving her doctorate in English and Creative Writing from the University of Illinois, Schreck has now received a Pushcart Prize, and had her work published in magazines and journals including The Rumpus, Image and Belt.

Brian Schlender studied creative writing at the Columbia College of Chicago, and now works as both a senior editor, writer and copyeditor in Chicago.

Noelle Aleksandra Hufnagel attended Western Michigan University to complete her BA in creative writing, and received her MFA in fiction writing from Columbia College of Chicago. Her work has been published in Story Week Reader, Zine Columbia and Fictionary. She is a novelist, blogger and editor for Hypertext.

Contributing Editor: Sarah Mulroe 
Achieving her BA in fiction writing from Columbia College Chicago, Sarah Mulroe served as an editor for Hair Trigger and currently resides in Chicago, working at a public library.

Annual short story & essay contest 
A recent addition to the magazine was the introduction of a short story and essay contest to be published in the Spring 2019 edition of Hypertext Review, the print journal. One winner in each genre will be awarded $100. The entry fee is $10.00 per submission.

Submissions are accepted between November 1, 2018 to January 1, 2019.

Winners will be revealed on February 1, 2019.

Writers that have been published in previous Hypertext Review’s include Nancy Ford Dugan, Ann-Marie Oomen, Tony Bowers, Char Lee Lorraine, Tara Betts, Nico Amador, Jessie Ann Foley, Juan Martinez, Chelsea Laine Wells, Elizabeth Metzger Sampson, Amanda Galvan Huynh, Karen Halvorsen Schreck, Ari Wolff, DeLon Howell, Yen Ha, Christine Sneed, Doro Boehme, Gail Wallace Bozzano, Gint Aras, M. Quinn Stifler, Yvonne B. Robery, Bridget Apfeld, Megan Sungyoon, M. Lynx Qualey, Peter Ferry, Garnett Kilberg Cohen, Nic Custer, Garin Cycholl, Tyler Barton, Richard Hartshorn, Anya Silver, and Laura Page.

Guest judges 
Fiction: Christine Sneed. A recipient of the Grace Paley Prize, Sneed has been published in numerous publications, including the New York Times, O Magazine and The Best American Short Stories. She currently resides in Pasadena, California, and works teaching the graduate creative writing classes for Northwestern University and Regis University.

Essays: Juan Martinez. The author of Best Worst American, Martinez resides in Chicago and teaches at Northwestern University. His work has been published in several publications, such as Huizache, Mississippi Review, NPR’s Selected Shorts and Ecotone. He was also the winner of the Neukom Institute Award for Debut Speculative Fiction.

Submission guidelines 
Prior to submitting, Hypertext Magazine asks writers to read both the print and online magazine to understand the type of content published.

The guidelines for short stories and novel excerpts should be 3000 words and under. However, up to 5000 words is acceptable for the print magazine and slight variations are tolerated. Similarly, the word limit for essays is 3000 words, and print is up to 5000 words. Writers should include a cover letter that details a short biography, their email and other relevant contact information with the submission.

Notable pieces

Interview with Christine Sneed 
The editor of Hypertext Magazine interviewed Christine Sneed, an American novelist and short-story writer, about her 2015 novel, Paris, He Said. The interview details "the artist’s quest for truth" at the centre of her novel, while Sneed explains how she "ignore(s) that rude voice…telling you that you’re not good enough." Furthermore, the interview explores the desire to be remembered after we die, how to ensure her legacy is meaningful, and Sneed’s writing process.

Excerpt from Joe Meno’s novel, ‘Marvel and a Wonder’ 
An excerpt from Joe Meno’s 2015 novel, Marvel and a Wonder was featured on Hypertext Magazine’s ‘Excerpt Featured’ page. The novel is set in 1995 in Indiana, where Jim Falls – a veteran of the Korean War - attempts to raise his teenage grandson on their farm. It was long-listed for the Andrew Carnegie Medal for Excellence in Fiction and Nonfiction.

'Me and Only Me' by Matthew Turkot 
Published on 27 July 2018, Turkot's short story, 'Me and Only Me' is a black comedy which explores the violent measures a person will take to become the 'number one' person in their partners life. The author is currently a student at Columbia College Chicago, studying an MFA in creative fiction. He works as both a bartender and teacher.

References

Biannual magazines published in the United States
Magazines established in 2010
Magazines published in Chicago
Online literary magazines published in the United States